was daimyo of Kai Province during the Sengoku period of Japan. Known as the "Tiger of Kai", he was one of the most powerful daimyo with exceptional military prestige in the late stage of the Sengoku period. Shingen was a warlord of great skill and military leadership.

Name

Shingen was called "Tarō" (a commonly used pet name for the eldest son of a Japanese family) or Katsuchiyo (勝千代) during his childhood. After his genpuku (coming of age ceremony), he was given the formal name Harunobu (晴信), which included a character from the name of Ashikaga Yoshiharu, the 12th shogun of the Ashikaga shogunate. It was a common practice in feudal Japan for a higher-ranked samurai to bestow a character from his own name to his inferiors as a symbol of recognition. From the local lord's perspective, it was an honour to receive a character from the shogunate, although the authority of the latter had greatly degenerated in the mid-16th century.

Both the Ashikaga and the Takeda clans descended from the Minamoto clan. Technically, Harunobu, as well as his forefathers, had borne the surname of Minamoto. Therefore, Harunobu would be referred to as "Minamoto no Harunobu" (源 晴信) in official records kept by the Imperial Court when he was conferred the official title of Daizen Daibu (大膳大夫,  Master of the Palace Table). The Imperial Court had maintained a system of ritsuryō that was parallel to the shogunate apparatus.

In February 1559 Harunobu chose to live a pabbajja life as a Buddhist novitiate and received a dharma name, Shingen (信玄), from his Buddhist master. The kanji of "Shingen" can also be pronounced as "Nobuharu", which is the inversion of his official name, Harunobu.  In ancient times, such religious names of recognized Japanese aristocrats would be read in "on'yomi" (音読み), the Chinese-style pronunciation, instead of "kun'yomi" (訓読み), the indigenous Japanese pronunciation.  Although widely known by the dharma name, Takeda Shingen's formal name remained Harunobu throughout the rest of his life.

Shingen is sometimes referred to as "The Tiger of Kai" (甲斐の虎) for his martial prowess on the battlefield. His primary rival, Uesugi Kenshin (上杉謙信), was often called "The Dragon of Echigo" (越後の龍) or also "The Tiger of Echigo" (越後の虎).

"These two seemed to have enjoyed meeting in battle."  They fought several times at Kawanakajima.

Early life and rise

Takeda Shingen was the first-born son of Takeda Nobutora (武田信虎), leader of the Takeda clan, and daimyō of the province of Kai. He had been an accomplished poet in his youth. He assisted his father with the older relatives and vassals of the Takeda clan, and became quite a valuable addition to the clan at a fairly young age. In 1536, at the age of 15, he was instrumental in helping his father win the Battle of Un no Kuchi.

At some point in his life after his "coming of age" ceremony, the young man decided to rebel against his father, Takeda Nobutora. He finally succeeded in 1540, successfully taking control of the clan. Events regarding this change of leadership are not entirely clear, but it is thought that Nobutora had planned to name the second son, Nobushige, as his heir instead of Shingen. The end result was a miserable retirement that was forced upon him by Shingen and his supporters: he was sent to Suruga Province, on the southern border of Kai, to be kept in custody under the scrutiny of the Imagawa clan, led by his son-in-law Imagawa Yoshimoto (今川義元), the daimyō of Suruga. For their help in this bloodless coup, an alliance was formed between the Imagawa and the Takeda clans.

Takeda campaign

Shinano campaign
Shingen's first act was to gain a hold of the area around him. His goal was to conquer Shinano Province. A number of the major warlords in the Shinano region marched on the border of Kai Province, hoping to neutralize the power of the still-young Shingen before he had a chance to expand into their lands.  However, planning to beat him down at Fuchu (where word had it Shingen was gathering his forces for a stand), they were unprepared when Takeda forces suddenly came down upon them at the Battle of Sezawa. Taking advantage of their confusion, Shingen was able to win a quick victory, which set the stage for his drive into Shinano lands that same year and his successful Siege of Uehara.  The young warlord made considerable advances into the region, conquering the Suwa clan's headquarters in the Siege of Kuwabara, before moving into central Shinano with the defeat of both Tozawa Yorichika and Takato Yoritsugu in the Siege of Fukuyo and Battle of Ankokuji. In 1543, he captured Nagakubo Castle, Kojinyama Castle in 1544, and then Takatō Castle and Ryūgasaki Castle in 1545. In 1546 he took Uchiyama Castle and won the Battle of Odaihara. In 1547, he took Shika Castle. 

In 1548, Shingen defeated Ogasawara Nagatoki in the Battle of Shiojiritoge and then took Fukashi Castle in 1550. However, the warlord was checked at Uedahara by Murakami Yoshikiyo, losing two of his generals in a heated battle which Murakami won. Shingen managed to avenge this loss and the Murakami clan was eventually defeated in the sieges of Toishi. Murakami fled the region, eventually coming to plead for help from the Province of Echigo.

In 1553, he captured Katsurao, Wada, Takashima and Fukuda castles. In 1554 he took Fukushima, Kannomine, Matsuo and Yoshioka castles.

Conflict with Uesugi

After conquering Shinano Province, Shingen faced another rival, Uesugi Kenshin of Echigo Province. The feud between them became legendary, and they faced each other on the battlefield five times in the Battles of Kawanakajima.

These battles were generally confined to controlled skirmishes, neither daimyō willing to devote himself entirely to a single all-out attempt. The conflict between the two that had the fiercest fighting, and might have decided victory or defeat for one side or the other, was the fourth battle, during which the famous tale arose of Uesugi Kenshin's forces clearing a path through the Takeda troops and Kenshin engaging Shingen in single combat. The tale has Kenshin attacking Shingen with his sword while Shingen defends with his iron war fan or tessen.  Both lords lost many men in this fight, and Shingen in particular lost two of his main generals, Yamamoto Kansuke and his younger brother Takeda Nobushige.

After the fourth battle of Kawanakajima, the Takeda clan suffered two internal setbacks.  Shingen uncovered two plots on his life, the first from his cousin Suwa Shigemasa (whom he ordered to commit seppuku), and the second, a few years later, from his own son Takeda Yoshinobu (武田義信). His son was confined to the Toko-ji temple, where he died two years later; it is not known whether his death was natural or ordered by his father. After this incident, Shingen designated his fourth son, Takeda Katsuyori (武田勝頼), as the acting leader of the clan after himself until Katsuyori's son came of age.

Kōzuke campaign
In 1563, Shingen allied with Hōjō Ujiyasu, and helped Ujiyasu capture Matsuyama Castle in Musashi Province. In 1565, Shingen then took Kuragano Castle and Minowa Castle in Kōzuke province.

In 1571, Uesugi Kenshin had advanced to the province of Kozuke and attacked the satellite castle of Shingen's, Ishikura Castle. Both forces met each other in the Battle of Tonegawa, but eventually disengaged after a well-fought fight.

Suruga campaign
The death of Takeda Yoshinobu is believed to have much to do with the change in Shingen's policy towards the Imagawa clan. After Imagawa Yoshimoto's death in a Battle of Okehazama against Oda Nobunaga in 1560, Shingen made an alliance with the Oda and Tokugawa clan, and started to plan an invasion of Suruga Province, a territory now controlled by Yoshimoto's son, Ujizane. Yoshinobu, however, had strongly opposed such a plan because his wife was the daughter of Yoshimoto. By 1567, nonetheless, after Shingen had successfully kept the forces led by Uesugi Kenshin out of the northern boundaries of Shinano Province, taken over a strategically important castle in western Kōzuke, and suppressed internal objection to his plans to take advantage of the weakened Imagawa clan, he was ready to carry out his planned Suruga invasion. Shingen and Tokugawa Ieyasu "came to terms" and occupied the "former Imagawa territory."  They both fought against Yoshimoto's heir, Imagawa Ujizane.

During this time Shingen also ordered the damming project of the Fuji River, which was one of the major domestic activities of the time.

Conflict with Hojo

In 1568, as a response to Hōjō clan intervention in his invasion of Suruga Province, Shingen broke the alliance with the Hōjō, and came into Musashi Province from his home province of Kai, attacking Takiyama Castle. He then moved against the Hojo by attacking Hachigata Castle, then engaged in the Siege of Odawara (1569). He burned Odawara Castle, then successfully withdrew after Hōjō Ujiteru and Hōjō Ujikuni failed to stop him in the Battle of Mimasetoge.

After defeating the intervention forces commanded by Hōjō Ujimasa of Sagami Province, Shingen finally secured the Suruga Province, formerly base of the prestigious Imagawa clan, as a Takeda asset in 1569.

At this point, Shingen now had Kai Province, Shinano Province, the western part of Kōzuke Province, Musashi Province and Suruga Province.

Conflict with Oda–Tokugawa alliance

By the time Takeda Shingen was 49 years old, he was the only daimyō with the necessary power and tactical skill to stop Oda Nobunaga's rush to rule Japan.

In 1572, upon securing Takeda control over Suruga, northern Shinano, and western Kōzuke, Shingen took Iwamura Castle, which caused the Takeda–Oda relationship to decline. Shingen engaged Tokugawa Ieyasu's forces in 1572 and captured Futamata.

In early 1573, Shingen decided to make a drive for Kyoto at the urgings of the shōgun Ashikaga Yoshiaki. While seeking a route from Kōfu to Kyoto, Shingen moved to challenge the Oda–Tokugawa alliance in the Battle of Mikatagahara, one of the most famous battles of Takeda Shingen's campaigns, and one of the best demonstrations of his cavalry-based tactics. It was also one of Tokugawa Ieyasu's worst defeats, and complete disaster was only narrowly averted. Shingen stopped his advance temporarily due to outside influences, which allowed the Tokugawa clan to prepare for battle again. In mid 1573, he led a formidable force of over 30,000 into Tokugawa territories in Tōtōmi, Mikawa, and Mino provinces.

Death

Once he entered Mikawa Province, in February, 1573, Shingen besieged Noda Castle, but soon died in his siege camp. The exact circumstances surrounding his death are not known. Some accounts say he succumbed to an old war wound, some say a sniper had wounded him earlier, and others that he died of pneumonia. He was buried at Erin-ji temple in what is now Kōshū, Yamanashi.

After Shingen's death, Takeda Katsuyori became the daimyō of the Takeda clan. Katsuyori was ambitious and wanted to continue his father's legacy. He moved to take Tokugawa forts. However, an allied force of Tokugawa Ieyasu and Oda Nobunaga dealt a crushing blow to the Takeda in the Battle of Nagashino when Nobunaga's matchlock-armed infantry destroyed the Takeda cavalry. Ieyasu seized the opportunity to defeat the weakened Takeda led by Takeda Katsuyori in the Battle of Tenmokuzan. Katsuyori committed suicide after the battle and the Takeda clan never recovered.

Legacy
Upon Takeda Shingen's death, Uesugi Kenshin reportedly wept at the loss of one of his strongest and most deeply-respected rivals. One of the most lasting tributes to Shingen's prowess was that of Tokugawa Ieyasu himself, who is known to have borrowed heavily from the old Takeda leader's governmental and military innovations after he had taken leadership of Kai Province during Toyotomi Hideyoshi's rise to power. Many of these designs were put to use in the Tokugawa shogunate.

While the Takeda were for the most part destroyed by the loss of Shingen's heir, Katsuyori, Shingen had a profound effect on the period in Japan. He influenced many lords with his law, tax, and administration systems, and many tales were told about him. Although aggressive towards military enemies he was probably not as cruel as other warlords. His war banner contained the famous phrase , taken from Sun Tzu's The Art of War. This phrase refers to the idea of Swift as the Wind, Silent as a Forest, Fierce as Fire and Immovable as a Mountain. The motto applied to Shingen's policies and his military strategy.

Retainers
During the Edo period, 24 retainers who served under Shingen were chosen as a popular topic for ukiyo-e and bunraku. The names vary from work to work and the following list is the widely agreed version of retainers. They had not all worked together, as some had died before others served, but they were noted for their exceptional contributions to Shingen and the Takeda clan.

Of his retainers, Kōsaka Masanobu stands out as being one of Shingen's better known beloveds, in the style of the Japanese shudō tradition. The two entered into the relationship when Shingen was 22 and Masanobu 16. The love pact signed by the two, in Tokyo University's Historical Archive, documents Shingen's pledge that he was not involved in, nor had any intentions of entering into, a sexual relationship with a certain other retainer, and asserts that "since I want to be intimate with you" he will in no way harm the boy, and calls upon the gods to be his guarantors. (Leupp, pp. 53–54)

Twenty-Four Generals of Takeda Shingen
 Akiyama Nobutomo
 Amari Torayasu
 Anayama Nobutada
 Baba Nobuharu
 Hara Masatane
 Hara Toratane
 Ichijō Nobutatsu, younger brother of Shingen
 Itagaki Nobukata
 Kiso Yoshimasa
 Kōsaka Masanobu
 Naitō Masatoyo
 Obata Masamori
 Obata Toramori
 Obu Toramasa
 Oyamada Nobushige
 Saegusa Moritomo
 Sanada Nobutsuna
 Sanada Yukitaka
 Tada Mitsuyori
 Tsuchiya Masatsugu
 Takeda Nobukado
 Takeda Nobushige
 Yamagata Masakage
 Yamamoto Kansuke
 Yokota Takatoshi

Other Generals
 Hoshina Masatoshi
 Morozumi Torasada
 Ohama Kagetaka
 Sanada Masayuki

Shingen-ko Festival

In the lunar calendar, Shingen died on the 12th day of the 4th month, and so April 12th is celebrated as the anniversary of his death (despite it being May 13th in the Gregorian calendar). Usually, a famous Japanese celebrity plays the part of Takeda Shingen. There are several parades going between the Takeda Shrine and Kofu Castle reflecting the various comings and goings of Takeda Shingen during his life.
The parades are very theatrical, involving serious re-enactors who practice all year for this one weekend.

Family
 Father: Takeda Nobutora (1494–1574)
Mother: Ōi no Kata
 Brothers:
 Takematsu (1517–1523)
 Inuchiyo (1523–1529)
 Takeda Nobushige (1525–1561)
 Takeda Nobumoto
 Takeda Nobukado (1529–1582)
 Matsuo Nobukore (c. 1530s–1571)
 Takeda Souchi
 Takeda Nobuzane (c. 1530s–1575)
 Ichijō Nobutatsu (c. 1539–1582)
 Sisters:
 Joukei-in (1519–1550), married Imagawa Yoshimoto
 Nanshou-in (born 1520) married Anayama Nobutomo
 Nene (1528–1543) married Suwa Yorishige
 Sons:
 Takeda Katsuyori by Suwa Goryōnin
 Takeda Yoshinobu by Lady Sanjō
 Takeda Nobuchika (also known as Unno Nobuchika) by Lady Sanjō
 Takeda Nobukiyo
 Nishina Morinobu
 Katsurayama Nobusada
 Daughters:
 Ōbai-in
 Kenshō-in
 Shinryu-in
 Matsuhime
 Kikuhime

In popular culture

Generations of farming peasants who become warriors to fight Takeda Shingen's battles are depicted in the 1960 movie The River Fuefuki, aka Fuefukigawa by director Keisuke Kinoshita. The film is based on a novel by Shichirō Fukazawa.
Shingen's life is depicted in the 1969 film Samurai Banners, seen through the eyes of his general Yamamoto Kansuke. The film is based on a novel by Inoue Yasushi titled Furin Kazan.
Takeda's battles with Uesugi Kenshin were dramatized in the movie Heaven and Earth.
Takeda Shingen's death is fictionalized in Akira Kurosawa's film Kagemusha.
He is mentioned on episode 31 of the Tokusatsu 1988 series Sekai Ninja Sen Jiraiya. The focus of this episode is the alleged missing Takeda Shingen's famous sword Nobutora, and its discovery in France.
His life is the subject of a historical novel by Jirō Nitta, which was adapted for television in the 1988 NHK Taiga drama Takeda Shingen, starring Kiichi Nakai, distributed internationally under the title Shingen.
Shingen the Ruler (Takeda Shingen 2 in Japan) is a turn-based strategy game for the Nintendo Entertainment System (NES), produced by Hot B in 1989, and released in North America in 1990.
The Takeda Clan is a faction in Creative Assembly's Shogun: Total War and Total War: Shogun 2 with Shingen himself appearing in the latter's opening cinematic.
In the 2020 video game "Ghost of Tsushima", the player can obtain an armour set (Gosaku's armour) that is very heavily inspired by Takeda Shingen's actual famous armour set. 
Takeda Shingen has appeared in Samurai Warriors and Sengoku Basara video game franchises, and in the anime Sengoku Basara: Samurai Kings. He is a character in all of the games of the Warriors Orochi series. He is a playable character in Pokémon Conquest (Pokémon + Nobunaga's Ambition in Japan), with his partner Pokémon being Rhyperior and Groudon.
In Samurai Champloo, the character Jin has the Takeda mon on his keikogi.
Video game music composer Ryu Umemoto (1974–2011) was a descendant of Takeda.
Takeda Shingen was mentioned in episode 10 of The Tatami Galaxy when the protagonist noted that a 4.5 tatami room is perfect, and if a room were to be larger than that, it would end up being "as spacious as Takeda Shingen's lavatory, and one might even get lost".
He is a main character in the anime Sengoku Basara: The Last Party and Sengoku Basara: Samurai Kings. He was shown with a superhuman strength, able to use a large ax with effortless precision, ride two horses in standing position, even riding up walls vertically.
In Battle Girls: Time Paradox, he appeared as a hotheaded woman who committed nothing to obtain the power of the red armor.
In the light novel The Ambition of Oda Nobuna, Shingen is portrayed as a cunning young woman who strongly opposes other daimyo.
Takeda is a playable character in the Mobile/PC Game Rise of Kingdoms.

References

External links

  "Legendary Takeda's 24 Generals" at Yamanashi-kankou.jp
 Samurai archives – Takeda Shingen
 Suwako Museum – (Japanese) – helmet of Suwa Hossyou (Shingen's Legendary Helmet)
 "Ten-Chi-Jin" General of Uesugi Clan Naoe Kanetsugu – (Japanese) – Kabuto (samurai helmet) Papercraft

1521 births
1573 deaths
Deaths from pneumonia in Japan
Daimyo
Takeda clan
16th-century Japanese LGBT people
16th-century Buddhist monks
Japanese Buddhist clergy
Muromachi period Buddhist clergy
Gay military personnel
Japanese gay men